The Gulfstar 43 is an American sailboat that was designed by Vince and Richard Lazarra as a cruiser and first built in 1971.

Production
The design was built by Gulfstar Yachts in the United States, between 1971 and 1978, but it is now out of production.

Design

The Gulfstar 43 is a recreational keelboat, built predominantly of fiberglass, with wood trim. It has a masthead sloop rig or optional ketch rig, a raked stem, a vertical transom, a keel-mounted rudder controlled by a wheel and a fixed long keel. It displaces  and carries  of ballast.

The boat is fitted with a British Perkins Engines diesel engine.

Variants
Gulfstar 43 MS
This model was introduced in 1971 and ten were built before production ended in 1973.
Gulfstar 43
This model was introduced in 1976 and 80 were built before production ended in 1978.
Gulfstar 43 Mark II
Improved model.

See also
List of sailing boat types

Similar sailboats
Hunter 44
C&C 44
Nordic 44

References

External links

Keelboats
1970s sailboat type designs
Sailing yachts
Sailboat type designs by Vince Lazarra
Sailboat type designs by Richard Lazarra
Sailboat types built by Gulfstar Yachts